Olufemi is the surname of:
John Olufemi (born 1984), Nigerian football (soccer) player
Lola Olufemi, British feminist writer
Oladapo Olufemi (born 1988), Nigerian football (soccer) player
Tosin Olufemi (born 1994), English footballer

See also
Olufela Olufemi Anikulapo Kuti, known as Femi Kuti (born 1962), Nigerian musician
Olúfẹ́mi O. Táíwò, Nigerian-American philosopher
Olufemi Terry, Sierra Leonean writer